Stenocercus festae, also known commonly as Peracca's whorltail iguana and Peracca's whorl-tailed iguana, is a species of lizard in the family Tropiduridae. The species is endemic to Ecuador.

Etymology
The specific name, festae, is in honor of Italian zoologist Enrico Festa.

Geographic range
S. festae is found in southern Ecuador, on both the eastern slope and the western slope of the Andes, in the provinces of Azuay, Cañar, and Loja.

Habitat

Description

Reproduction
S. festae is oviparous.

References

Further reading
Fritts TH (1974). "A multivariate evolutionary analysis of the Andean Iguanid lizards of the genus Stenocercus ". San Diego Society of Natural History Memoir 7: 1–89. (Stenocercus festae, new combination, pp. 49–51 + Figure 37 on p. 81).
Peracca MG (1897). "Viaggio del Dr. Enrico Festa nell'Ecuador e regioni vicine. IV. ". Bollettino dei Musei di Zoologia ed Anatomia comparata della R[egia]. Università di Torino 12 (300): 1–20. (Leiocephalus festae, new species, pp. 6–7, including drawing of scalation of ear opening). (in Italian).
Torres-Carvajal O (2000). "Ecuadorian Lizards of the Genus Stenocercus (Squamata: Tropiduridae)". Scientific Papers, Natural History Museum, The University of Kansas (15): 1–38. (Stenocercus festae, pp. 15–17, Figure 8). (in English, with an abstract in Spanish).
Torres-Carvajal O, Schulte JA II, Cadle JE (2006). "Phylogenetic relationships of South American lizards of the genus Stenocercus (Squamata: Iguania): A new approach using a general mixture model for gene sequence data". Molecular Phylogenetics and Evolution 39 (1): 171–185.

Stenocercus
Reptiles described in 1897
Endemic fauna of Ecuador
Reptiles of Ecuador
Taxa named by Mario Giacinto Peracca